

Wandre Guitars is an electric guitar brand started by the Italian guitar manufacturer Antonio Vandrè Pioli. These guitars are famous for their original shapes, aluminium necks and unique switches.

The guitars were originally designed and manufactured from 1957 to 1968 by Pioli in Cavriago, Italy. Very small productions were made, which makes these guitars very sought-after in the vintage guitar market. Some guitars by Pioli have appeared under other brand names such as Framez, Davoli, Dallas, Avalon, Noble, Lipsky.

Models

Wandre made a lot of model of doublebasses, basses and guitars 

 Classich doublebass
 Pocket bass
 Naika doublebass
 Marte duoblebass
 Quarieg doublebass
 Electro Blitz Bass
 Swedenbass
 Roc'n'Roll
 Brigitte Bardot
 Calypso
 Rock Oval
 Waid
 Selene
 Rock
 Spazial
 Blue Jeans / Teenager / Trilam 
 Piper
 Bikini
 Twist
 Tigre
 Doris
 Polyphon
 Cobra
 Etrurian
 Powertone
 Soloist
 Psychedelic Sound
 Mini

Notes

References
  (See also excerpted photographs)

External links

 
 

Guitar manufacturing companies
Musical instrument manufacturing companies of Italy